The Division Excellence (DEX-H) is the top professional basketball league in Morocco. Founded in 1957, the league currently consists of 16 teams. The league is administered by the Royal Moroccan Basketball Federation (FRMBB). The current defending champions are AS Salé, who have won the league seven seasons in a row.

Current clubs 
The following 16 teams play in the Division Excellence during the 2020–21 season:

Champions
The following is a list of all the Moroccan top-tier division champions (numbers in brackets denote the title number of the team):

 1935: RU Casablanca (1)
 1936: RU Casablanca (2)
 1937: RU Casablanca (3)
 From 1938 to 1940: No competition played
 1941: RU Casablanca (4)
 1942: RU Casablanca (5)
 From 1943 to 1944: No competition played
 1945: US Fès (1)
 1946: B.U.S (1)
 1947: OC Khouribga (1)
 1948: OC Khouribga (2)
 1949: OC Khouribga (3)
 1950: A.S.P.T.T (1)
 1951: A.S.P.T.T (2)
 1952: US Marocaine (1)
 1953: US Marocaine (2)
 1954: US Marocaine (3)
 1955: US Marocaine (4)
 1956: B.U.S (2)
 1957: AS Casablanca (1)
 1958: US Marocaine (5)
 1959: US Marocaine (6)
 1960: Maghreb SR (1)
 1961: CC Casablanca (1)
 1962: AS Casablanca (2)
 1963: AS Casablanca (3)
 1964: FAR de Rabat (1)
 1965: Wydad AC (1)
 1966: Wydad AC (2)
 1967: Wydad AC (3)
 1968: FUS Rabat (1)
 1969: FAR de Rabat (2)
 1970: FUS Rabat (2)

 1971: FUS Rabat (3)
 1972: FUS Rabat (4)
 1973: FUS Rabat (5)
 1974: Cercle Casablanca (1)
 1975: Wydad AC (4)
 1976: Wydad AC (5)
 1977: Cercle Casablanca (2)
 1978: FUS Rabat (6)
 1979: FUS Rabat (7)
 1980: FUS Rabat (8)
 1981: FUS Rabat (9)
 1982: Wydad AC (6)
 1983: Wydad AC (7)
 1984: FUS Rabat (10)
 1985: Wydad AC (8)
 1986: FAR de Rabat (3)
 1987: TS Casablanca (1)
 1988: FUS Rabat (11)
 1989: TS Casablanca (2)
 1990: FUS Rabat (12)
 1991: BMCI Club (1)
 1992: FUS Rabat (13)
 1993: Ittihad Tanger (1)
 1994: FUS Rabat (14)
 1995: TS Casablanca (3)
 1996: Maghreb de Fès (1)
 1997: Maghreb de Fès (2)
 1998: Maghreb de Fès (3)
 1999: FUS Rabat (15)
 2000: Wydad AC (9)
 2001: FUS Rabat (16)
 2002: TS Casablanca (4)
 2003: Maghreb de Fès (4)

 2004: FUS Rabat (17)
 2005: Raja CA (1)
 2006: Raja CA (2)
 2007 Maghreb de Fès (5)
 2008 Ittihad Tanger (2)
 2009 Ittihad Tanger (3)
 2010 AS Salé (1)
 2011 AS Salé (2)
 2012: Renaissance Berkane (1)
 2013: Wydad AC (10)
 2014: AS Salé (3)
 2015: AS Salé (4)
 2016: AS Salé (5)
 2017: AS Salé (6)
 2018: AS Salé (7)
 2019: No competition due to the COVID-19 pandemic
 2020: No competition due to the COVID-19 pandemic
 2021: AS Salé (8)
 2022: AS Salé (9)

Recent champions

References

External links
Presentation at Goalzz.com 
Presentation at Afrobasket.com

 

Basketball competitions in Morocco
Mor